Spathiopteryx is an extinct genus of wasp currently comprises a single species Spathiopteryx alavarommopsis.

References

Taxa named by Michael S. Engel